Ebonshire is the 27th album released by Nox Arcana. It is a collection of songs from 5 earlier volumes in a series of winter holiday EPs inspired by Nox Arcana's holiday music trilogy: Winter's Knight (2005), Winter's Eve (2009), and Winter's Majesty (2012), which are each set in a fantasy realm called Ebonshire. This full-length release includes 4 new tracks.

Composer Joseph Vargo explained that each year a new volume of songs is to be added to the Ebonshire series for the winter holiday season.

Track listing
 The Shire Path — 2:29
 Winterdream — 3:43
 Homeward Bound — 2:53
 Drifting Ivory — 3:57
 Through Wintry Wilds — 2:41
 Shades Of The Past — 2:37
 December’s Child — 2:49
 Winter Spell — 4:13
 Running With Wolves — 2:58
 Candles In The Snow — 3:01
 Lost In Time — 3:23
 Echoes of Elise — 3:29
 Hearthside Lullaby — 3:25
 The Dark Before The Dawn — 4:15
 Silver Horizon — 3:25
 Kindred Spirits — 2:42
 Solstice Eve — 3:30
 Evening Snowfall — 3:52
 Stars In The Heavens — 3:58
 Rex Ventorum — 3:53
 Journey's End — 7:34 *
 Includes a bonus track.

References

External links 
 Nox Arcana's official website
[ Ebonshire] at Allmusic

Nox Arcana albums
2018 albums
2018 Christmas albums
Christmas EPs
Christmas albums by American artists
New-age Christmas albums